The Champe-Fremont 1 Archeological Site, in the vicinity of Omaha, Nebraska, is an archeological site which was listed on the National Register of Historic Places in 1975.

References

Archaeological sites in Nebraska
National Register of Historic Places in Douglas County, Nebraska
National Register of Historic Places in Sarpy County, Nebraska